The American Psychological Foundation (abbreviated APF) is an American philanthropic organization dedicating to awarding research grants to psychologists in the early stages of their careers. It is affiliated with the American Psychological Association.

History
The American Psychological Foundation was established in 1953 by six psychologists, initially with a budget of $580. One of the APF's founders was Joseph McVicker Hunt, who went on to serve as its first president. Other past presidents of the foundation include Dorothy Cantor, who oversaw the initiation of two major fundraising campaigns: the Campaign for a New Era in 2000, and the Campaign to Transform the Future in 2012. Cantor was replaced by Terence M. Keane in 2017.

References

External links

Philanthropic organizations based in the United States
Organizations established in 1953
Psychology organizations based in the United States
1953 establishments in the United States